Square was a Japanese video game development and publishing company founded in September 1986 by Masashi Miyamoto. It began as a computer game software division of Den-Yu-Sha, a power line construction company owned by Miyamoto's father. Square's first titles were The Death Trap and its sequel Will: The Death Trap II; they sold over 100,000 copies, a major success for the time. In September 1986, Square spun off from Den-Yu-Sha and became an independent company officially named Square Co., Ltd. While its next few games sold poorly, 1987's Final Fantasy sold over 500,000 copies, sparking the company's flagship series.

Square was best known for its role-playing video game franchises, which include the Final Fantasy series. Of its properties, this franchise is the best-selling, with total worldwide sales of over 173 million units. During its existence, the company developed or published dozens of titles in various video game franchises on numerous gaming systems. On April 1, 2003, Square merged with video game publisher Enix to form Square Enix. This list includes retail games developed or published by Square during its existence.

Games

References

External links 
 Official Japanese game list 

Video game lists by company